10-K Thirst Quencher was a sports drink that competed with Gatorade, Powerade, and other sports drink brands.

It was bottled in the USA by Kentwood Spring Water, but was a brand owned by Suntory, a Japanese conglomerate. It was marketed in the US with the slogan "Really Really Good Stuff", and was probably named for the 10K race. 

A television commercial promoting 10-K in the New Orleans, Louisiana market appeared in 1987 featuring New Orleans Saints coach Jim Mora, LSU Tigers football coach Mike Archer, Tulane Green Wave football coach Mack Brown, and LSU men's basketball coach Dale Brown. Another ad appeared circa 1994, promoting a chance for viewers to look under the cap to win a trip to Nickelodeon Studios in Orlando, Florida and attend a taping of Nickelodeon GUTS (complete with a chance to climb the Aggro Crag). Runners-up received various other GUTS merchandise.

The drink seems to have disappeared from national markets around 2002 due to a drought in profits.

10K was formerly used by college and professional sports teams as their preferred sports drink vendor in the 1980s and 1990s such as Florida Eagles.
It was used by the athletic department at Florida State University until at least 1995. The New York Fire Department formerly equipped its "Recuperation and Care," or "RAC," units with 10-K, to be served to firefighters at the scenes of major incidents.

References 

Sports drinks